Epos Now is a cloud-based software provider, specialising in the design and manufacture of electronic point of sale (commonly referred to as EPOS) systems and integrated payments solutions.

References

Companies based in Norwich
Companies based in Orlando, Florida
Point of sale companies
Mobile technology
Retail point of sale systems
Cloud computing providers
Payment systems
Business software